Mayakovskaya is a station on the Nevsko–Vasileostrovskaya Line of Saint Petersburg Metro, opened on November 3, 1967, and named after Russian poet Vladimir Mayakovsky. The main surface vestibule is situated on Nevsky Prospekt. Mayakovskaya is connected to the station Ploshchad Vosstaniya of the Kirovsko-Vyborgskaya Line via a transfer corridor and a set of escalators. The transfer corridor also links both stations to Moskovsky Rail Terminal

External links

Saint Petersburg Metro stations
Nevsky Prospekt
Railway stations in Russia opened in 1967
Railway stations located underground in Russia